The Federal Party of Kenya (FPK) is a political party in Kenya.

History
The FPK nominated 20 National Assembly candidates for the 2007 general elections, receiving 0.2% of the vote and failing to win a seat.

In the 2013 elections the party nominated 56 National Assembly candidates; increasing its vote share to 1.6% and winning three seats; Michael Aringo Onyura in Butula, Peter Safari Shehe in Ganze and Charles Gimose in Hamisi. It also won one seat in the Senate, Ali Abdi Bule in Tana River County.

References

External links

Political parties in Kenya
Political parties with year of establishment missing